Bjørn Borgen (22 September 1937 – 18 November 2015) was a Norwegian footballer who played for Fredrikstad and Lyn, as well as the national team, as a right winger. He later became a coach active in the lower leagues.

Early career
Born in Fredrikstad, Borgen began his career with local team Ørn Fjeldberg before joining Fredrikstad in 1948 at the age of 11, alongside Per Kristoffersen. He won the 1955 Norwegian Junior Cup with the team. He made his debut for the first-team the next year.

Debut with the Norway national team
By 1957 he was a first-team regular, and had also made his debut for the national team. He suffered from behavioural problems in 1958, and eventually left the club in January 1959 to work in a clothes shop in Oslo and play for Lyn. He returned to Fredrikstad in October 1959, and in 1960 became the youngest Norwegian international to collect 25 caps. That same year he also turned down a professional contract offer from Italian club Fiorentina.

Later career
Borgen spent a significant part of the 1962 season injured. He retired from playing in 1968, alongside Kristoffersen. With Fredrikstad he won the league championship three times, and also the national cup three times. He scored 6 goals in 35 senior international appearances for Norway, and also represented them at youth level.

He later became a coach of lower-league teams, including Rapid, Moss, Trosvik and Rolvsøy. He also played for Rolvsøy in a Cup match in 1972, against Fredrikstad.

Death and legacy
Borgen died on 18 November 2015 following a long illness. Kristoffersen subsequently described him as the best right winger Norway has ever produced.

References

1937 births
2015 deaths
Norwegian footballers
Fredrikstad FK players
Lyn Fotball players
Eliteserien players
Norwegian First Division players
Association football wingers
Norwegian football managers
Sportspeople from Fredrikstad
Norway international footballers